Luis Iván Cartés Maidana (born 28 March 1998) is a Uruguayan footballer who plays as a goalkeeper for Rampla Juniors in the Uruguayan Segunda División on loan from Peñarol.

References

External links

1998 births
Living people
Plaza Colonia players
Uruguayan Segunda División players
Uruguayan footballers
Association football goalkeepers
Peñarol players
Rampla Juniors players